Annette is a given name that is the diminutive of Anna or Anne, and has been used as a name of its own since the Industrial Age. In Greek, the variant Anneta is used.

People
Notable people with the name include:

Annette Abbott Adams (1877–1956), American lawyer and judge
Annette Allcock (1923–2001), British artist
Annette Badland (born 1950), British actress
Annette Bear-Crawford (1853–1899), Australian suffragist
Annette Bening (born 1958), American actress
Annette Brooke (born 1947), British politician
Annette Chaparro (born 1967), American politician
Annette Cleveland, American politician from Washington state
Annette Cottle, American volleyball player and coach
Annette Dubas (born 1956), American politician from Nebraska
 Annette Dytrt (born 1983), German figure skater
Annette Ellis (born 1946), Australian politician
Annette Fugmann-Heesing (born 1955), German politician
 Annette Funicello (1942–2013), American actress and singer
Annette Glenn, American politician
Annette Groth (born 1954), German politician
Annette Groth (born 1952), Norwegian journalist
Annette Herfkens (born 1961), Dutch-Venezuelan sole survivor
Annette Holmberg-Jansson (born 1969), Finnish politician
 Annette Humpe (born 1950), German songwriter, pop singer, and record producer
Annette Hurley (born 1955), Australian politician
 Annette Imhausen (born 1970), German historian of ancient Egyptian mathematics
Annette King (born 1947), New Zealand politician
Annette Kolb (1870–1967), the working name of German author and pacifist Anna Mathilde Kolb
Annette Kolb (born 1983), German tennis player
Annette Lovemore (born 1958), South African politician
Annette Lu (born 1944), Taiwanese politician
Annette Main (born 1951/1952), New Zealand politician
Annette Meeks (born 1960), American politician
Annette Nijs (born 1961), Dutch politician
Princess Annette of Orange-Nassau (born 1972), member of the Dutch nobility
Annette Penhaligon (born 1946), British politician
Annette Quijano (born 1962), American politician
Annette Robinson, American politician
Annette Schavan (born 1955), German politician
Annette Solange Georges (born 1957), Seychellois politician and lawyer
Annette Strauss (1924–1998), American politician
Annette Steyn (born 1969), South African politician
Annette Sweeney (born 1957), American politician
Annette Sykes (born 1961), New Zealand activist and lawyer
Annette Taddeo (born 1967), American politician
Annette Thommessen (1932–1994), French-Norwegian human rights activist
Annette Vilhelmsen (born 1959), Danish politician
Annette von Droste-Hülshoff (1797-1848), German writer
Annette Werner (born 1966), German mathematician
Annette Polly Williams (1937–2014), American counselor, clerical worker and politician
Annette Ziegler (born 1964), American attorney and judge
 Annette, Special Operations Executive codename for Yvonne Cormeau, a British spy during World War II

Fictional Characters
Annette Fantine Dominic, a character from the video game Fire Emblem: Three Houses
Annette Pavlovna Scherer, a character from the Russian literary work War and Peace

References

Feminine given names
Dutch feminine given names
English feminine given names
French feminine given names
German feminine given names
Scottish feminine given names